Halfdan Egedius (May 5, 1877 –  February 2, 1899) was a Norwegian painter and illustrator.

Biography
Halfdan Johnsen Egedius was born in Drammen in Buskerud county and grew up in Christiania (now Oslo). His interest in painting and illustration began at the age of 5 and he showed exceptional artistic abilities early. He attended art school from the age of 9 at the school of art of Knud Bergslien, where he was a pupil from 1886 to 1889. In 1891 he was a pupil of Erik Werenskiold, and from 1891 to 1892 he studied at the Arts and Crafts School in Christiania.  In 1894 he attended the Harriet Backer art school. During spring 1896, he was a student of Kristian Zahrtmann in Copenhagen. From the age of 15 he began painting the landscape of Telemark.

Professionally known as Halfdan Johnsen Egedius, he was active from the age of 16 until his premature death at the age of 21. In his short life he managed to create several Norwegian masterpieces in a variety of styles. He is best known for his illustrations of the Heimskringla in a style inspired by Werenskiold.

Egedius became ill during a summer stay in Telemark in 1898, and after relapsing before Christmas, was hospitalized in Christiania, where he died in February 1899, not yet 22 years old. The cause of death was actinomycosis, a bacterial infection that attacked the internal organs. He was buried in the churchyard at Vestre Aker. Fifty years after his death, a memorial stone was erected.

Gallery

References

Sources
 Walther Halvorsen. Halfdan Egedius. Gyldendal 1914
 Øistein Parmann. Halfdan Egedius: liv og verk. Dreyer, Oslo, 1990.

External links

 
 
 MyNDIR (My Norse Digital Image repository) illustrations by Halfdan Egedius from Kongesagaer. Clicking on the thumbnail will give you the full image and information concerning it.

1877 births
1899 deaths
People from Drammen
Norwegian illustrators
Deaths from actinomycosis
19th-century Norwegian painters
19th-century male artists